Syntheta is a genus of moths of the family Noctuidae.

Species
 Syntheta novaguinensis (Bethune-Baker, 1906)
 Syntheta xylitis Turner, 1902

References
Natural History Museum Lepidoptera genus database
Syntheta at funet

Hadeninae